Uruguaysuchus is an extinct genus of crocodylomorphs from the Late Cretaceous Guichón Formation of Uruguay. It was related to Simosuchus and Malawisuchus.

References 

Uruguaysuchids
Terrestrial crocodylomorphs
Late Cretaceous crocodylomorphs of South America
Cretaceous Uruguay
Fossils of Uruguay
Fossil taxa described in 1933
Prehistoric pseudosuchian genera